Yeshiva Derech Hatorah School is a private, Jewish school in Cleveland Heights, Ohio. The school was formerly named Mosdos Ohr HaTorah until 2015 when it was reorganized under the Yeshiva Derech Hatorah organization.

History
The girls school was opened in 1993.

Facing a debt of about $14 million, Mosdos Ohr HaTorah applied for a judicial dissolution of its two corporations in Cuyahoga County Common Pleas Court in July 2015. In December 2015, Yeshiva Derech HaTorah, a Cleveland-based non profit organization acquired the school and its properties, and renamed the school.

Notes and references

High schools in Cuyahoga County, Ohio
Educational institutions established in 1900
Cleveland Heights, Ohio
Jewish day schools in Ohio
Private high schools in Ohio
Private middle schools in Ohio
Private elementary schools in Ohio
1900 establishments in Ohio